Allium clathratum is a species of onions native to temperate Asia (Xinjiang, Kazakhstan, Mongolia, and Siberia (Tuva, Krasnoyarsk, Western Siberia, and Altay Krai)). It grows on dry slopes and cliff faces at elevations of 400–2000 m.

Allium clathratum produces narrow bulbs rarely more than 10m mm wide. Umbel is hemispheric, with many pink flowers.

References

clathratum
Onions
Flora of temperate Asia
Plants described in 1830